This list summarises the country subdivisions which have a separate article on their politics. Countries where significant powers delegated to federal units or to devolved governments and where the political system is multi-party democracy are more likely to have articles on the politics of their subdivisions.

Entities listed in the article List of countries are shows in the article Politics of present-day nations and states.

Australia

Belgium

 Politics of Flanders
 Politics of Wallonia
 Politics of the Brussels-Capital Region

Bosnia and Herzegovina

 Politics of Republika Srpska
 Federation of Bosnia and Herzegovina

Canada

 Politics of Ontario
 Politics of Quebec
 Politics of Nova Scotia
 Politics of New Brunswick
 Politics of Manitoba
 Politics of British Columbia
 Politics of Prince Edward Island
 Politics of Saskatchewan
 Politics of Alberta
 Politics of Newfoundland and Labrador
 Politics of Northwest Territories
 Politics of Yukon
 Politics of Nunavut

China

Denmark

 Politics of the Faroe Islands

Finland

 Politics of Åland

France

Georgia (country)

Politics of Abkhazia
Politics of Samegrelo-Zemo Svaneti
Politics of Guria
Politics of Adjara
Politics of Racha-Lechkhumi and Kvemo Svaneti
Politics of Imereti
Politics of Samtskhe-Javakheti
Politics of Shida Kartli
Politics of South Ossetia
Politics of Mtskheta-Mtianeti
Politics of Kvemo Kartli
Politics of Kakheti
Politics of Tbilisi

Germany

India

Iran
 Politics of Khūzestān Province

Italy

Russia

 Politics of Adygea
 Politics of Bashkortostan
 Politics of Buryatia
 Politics of Altai Republic
 Politics of Dagestan
 Politics of Ingushetia
 Politics of Kabardino-Balkaria
 Politics of Kalmykia
 Politics of Karachay–Cherkessia
 Politics of Karelia
 Politics of Komi
 Politics of Mari El
 Politics of Mordovia
 Politics of Sakha (Yakutia)
 Politics of North Ossetia-Alania
 Politics of Tatarstan
 Politics of Tyva
 Politics of Udmurtia
 Politics of Khakassia
 Politics of Chechnya
 Politics of Chuvashia
 Politics of Altai Krai
 Politics of Kamchatka
 Politics of Krasnodar
 Politics of Krasnoyarsk
 Politics of Primorsky
 Politics of Stavropol
 Politics of Khabarovsk
 Politics of Perm
 Politics of Amur
 Politics of Arkhangelsk
 Politics of Astrakhan
 Politics of Belgorod
 Politics of Bryansk
 Politics of Vladimir
 Politics of Volgograd
 Politics of Vologda
 Politics of Voronezh
 Politics of Ivanovo
 Politics of Irkutsk
 Politics of Kaliningrad
 Politics of Kaluga
 Politics of Kemerovo
 Politics of Kirov
 Politics of Kostroma
 Politics of Kurgan
 Politics of Kursk
 Politics of Leningrad
 Politics of Lipetsk
 Politics of Magadan
 Politics of Moscow
 Politics of Murmansk
 Politics of Nizhny Novgorod
 Politics of Novgorod
 Politics of Novosibirsk
 Politics of Omsk
 Politics of Orenburg
 Politics of Oryol
 Politics of Penza
 Politics of Pskov
 Politics of Rostov
 Politics of Ryazan
 Politics of Samara
 Politics of Saratov
 Politics of Sakhalin
 Politics of Sverdlovsk
 Politics of Smolensk
 Politics of Tambov
 Politics of Tver
 Politics of Tomsk
 Politics of Tula
 Politics of Tyumen
 Politics of Ulyanovsk
 Politics of Chelyabinsk
 Politics of Chita
 Politics of Yaroslavl
 Politics of St. Petersburg
 Politics of the Jewish Autonomous Oblast
 Politics of Aga Buryatia
 Politics of Nenetsia
 Politics of Ust-Orda Buryatia
 Politics of Khantia-Mansia
 Politics of Chukotka
 Politics of Yamalia

Serbia

 Politics of Vojvodina

South Africa

 Politics of the Western Cape
 Politics of the Northern Cape
 Politics of the Eastern Cape
 Politics of KwaZulu-Natal
 Politics of the Free State
 Politics of North West (South African province)
 Politics of Gauteng
 Politics of Mpumalanga
 Politics of Limpopo

Spain

 Politics of Andalusia
 Politics of Aragon
 Politics of the Balearic Islands
 Politics of the Basque Country
 Politics of the Canary Islands
 Politics of Cantabria
 Politics of Castile and León
 Politics of Castile-La Mancha
 Politics of Catalonia
 Politics of Extremadura
 Politics of Navarre
 Politics of Galicia
 Politics of La Rioja
 Politics of Madrid
 Politics of Asturias
 Politics of Murcia
 Politics of Valencia
 Politics of Ceuta
 Politics of Melilla

Sudan

 Politics of Southern Sudan

Ukraine

 Politics of Crimea

United Kingdom

Politics of England (Note that England is not a current political division)
Politics of Scotland
Politics of Wales
Politics of Northern Ireland

United States